Nocciano is a comune and town in the Province of Pescara in the Abruzzo region of Italy.

References

See also 
 Castello De Sterlich-Aliprandi